Sir William Bowman, 1st Baronet (20 July 1816 – 29 March 1892) was an English surgeon, histologist and anatomist. He is best known for his research using microscopes to study various human organs, though during his lifetime he pursued a successful career as an ophthalmologist.

Life
Born in Nantwich, Cheshire, third son of a banker and amateur botanist/geologist, Bowman attended Hazelwood School near Birmingham from 1826. A childhood accident involving gunpowder is supposed to have interested him in medicine, and he was apprenticed to surgeon Joseph Hodgson at Birmingham General Hospital in 1832. He left Birmingham in 1837 to further his training as a surgeon and attended King's College London, where he served as a prosector under Robert Bentley Todd, a Professor of physiology.

His earliest notable work was on the structure of striated muscle, for which he was elected a Fellow of the Royal Society in 1841. At the young age of 25, he identified what then became known as the Bowman's capsule, a key component of the nephron. He presented his findings in 1842 in his paper "On the Structure and Use of the Malpighian Bodies of the Kidney" to the Royal Society and was awarded the Royal Medal. His collaboration with Todd led to the publication of the five-volume "Physiological Anatomy and Physiology of Man" (1843–1856) and "Cyclopaedia of Anatomy and Physiology" (1852), which detailed their research on microscopy and histology, relating minute anatomical observations to physiological functions. Their extensive use of the microscopes revolutionized the study of anatomy and physiology. Apart from the Bowman's capsule, other anatomical structures named after him include:
 Bowman's glands – in the olfactory mucosa
 Bowman's layer – the anterior limiting layer in the cornea

After completing his surgical training in 1844, Bowman practised as an ophthalmologist at the Royal London Ophthalmic Hospital (later known as Moorfields Eye Hospital). He was an early user of the ophthalmoscope invented by Hermann von Helmholtz in 1851. Between 1848 and 1855, he also taught at King's College. In 1880, he founded the 'Ophthalmological Society', which later became the Royal College of Ophthalmologists.

In 1870 he commissioned Arts and Crafts architect Philip Webb to rebuild Joldwynds, Bowman's house in Holmbury St Mary, Surrey. It was completed in 1874.

In 1884, Queen Victoria created him as a baronet. He died at Joldwynds on 29 March 1892, and is buried in the neighbouring churchyard of Holmbury St. Mary. A memorial to him lies within St James's Church, Piccadilly.

Family
On 28 Dec. 1842, he married Harriet, fifth daughter of Thomas Paget of Leicester, by whom he had seven children. 
She died at Joldwynds on 25 October 1900. 
He was succeeded in the title by his eldest son, Sir Paget Bowman.

Publications by Sir William Bowman
 , full download available at Google Book Search.
 , full download available at Google Book Search.

References

Attribution

Sources

External links
 Heath, Parker. Sir William Bowman. Bull Med Libr Assoc. 1936 May; 24(4): 205–208. Scanned pages of the original article, at PubMed Central.
 Thomas, K.B. The manuscripts of Sir William Bowman. Med Hist. 1966 July; 10(3): 245–256. PDF article at PubMed Central.

1816 births
1892 deaths
People from Nantwich
English anatomists
British ophthalmologists
19th-century English medical doctors
Alumni of King's College London
Academics of King's College London
Baronets in the Baronetage of the United Kingdom
Fellows of the Royal Society
Fellows of the Royal College of Surgeons
Royal Medal winners
Histologists